Cimcimax is a village in the Zaqatala District of Azerbaijan. The village forms part of the municipality of Mamrux.

References

External links

Populated places in Zaqatala District